Dae-ho Lee (Hanja: 李大浩; ; born June 21, 1982) is a former South Korean professional baseball player who played as a first baseman for the Lotte Giants of the KBO League. Lee had previously played for the Orix Buffaloes and Fukuoka SoftBank Hawks of Nippon Professional Baseball (NPB), and the Seattle Mariners of Major League Baseball (MLB).

Lee bats and throws right-handed. He hit home runs in nine consecutive games for the first time in world baseball history. According to a Gallup Korea's survey conducted in 2011, Lee was chosen as the most popular player in the KBO League.

Amateur career
Lee started baseball because of his childhood friendship with Shin-soo Choo. Lee attended Kyungnam High School in Busan, South Korea. At Kyungnam High School, Lee batted fourth and could throw a mid-90s mph fastball as a pitcher. In 2000, he was selected for the South Korean Junior National Team as a pitcher. The team won the 2000 World Junior Baseball Championship in Edmonton, Alberta, Canada, and Lee led the attack alongside Kim Tae-kyun, Choo Shin-soo (the eventual MVP of this event) and Jeong Keun-woo as a cleanup hitter by racking up 3 home runs. He also finished runner-up behind Joe Mauer of Team USA in batting average (.500).

Notable international careers

Professional career

KBO League

2001 season
As a rookie, Lee joined the Lotte Giants as a pitcher in 2001. However, following an injury, he was officially changed to a position player for the second half of the 2001 season.

2006 season
In the 2006 season, Lee won the league's Triple Crown with a  batting average, 26 home runs, and 88 RBIs. This is the second time a hitter has won the Batting Triple Crown in the Korea Professional Baseball league. He finished second in voting for the 2006 MVP behind the Hanhwa Eagles pitcher Ryu Hyun-jin, also the winner of the Triple Crown for pitchers in 2006.

2008 season

2010 season
On August 13, 2010, Lee wrote a new chapter in Korean baseball by hitting a home run in eight straight games in the league. The eighth home run was hit at an away match against the Kia Tigers in Gwangju in the top of the seventh inning  when he sent former Major Leaguer Aquilino López's fifth pitch over the left fence of Moodeung Stadium. On August 14, 2010, Lee set a world record by hitting a home run in his ninth straight game when, in the second inning of Giants' second away match against the Tigers, he blasted a three-run homer off Tigers reliever Kim Hee-girl over the center fence of Moodeung Stadium. It was his 38th home run of the season. With his 83rd run that year, he set a new Korean League record with a run in 16 consecutive games. 
In the 2010 season, Lee enjoyed one of the most dominant offensive seasons in world professional baseball history, leading the KBO in seven offensive categories (batting average, HRs, RBIs, runs scored, on-base percentage, slugging percentage and hits), which made him a Septuple Crown winner (7관왕).

2011 season
Lee led the KBO League in batting average (.357), hits (176), and on-base percentage (.433). After the season, he declared free agency and sought out a new challenge.

Nippon Professional Baseball 

In December 2011, Lee signed a two-year contract worth 760 million yen ($9.78 million) with the Orix Buffaloes of the Nippon Professional Baseball. During his 4 years in the NPB (2012-2015), he recorded the highest OPS rate during this time.

2012 season 
On July 20, 2012, at the Osaka Dome, Lee won the NPB Home-run Derby against Wladimir Balentien of the Tokyo Yakult Swallows. He belted 6 home runs while Balentien made no home runs. He was rewarded with 500,000 yen ($6,400). He ended his season with a .286 average, 24 home runs, and 91 RBI.

Major League Baseball

Seattle Mariners 

On February 3, 2016, Lee signed a minor league contract with the Seattle Mariners of Major League Baseball. The Mariners added Lee to the 40-man roster on March 27, 2016.

On April 8, 2016, Lee recorded his first career major league hit, a home run off of Eric Surkamp in a game against the Oakland Athletics. On April 13, 2016, Lee hit a pinch hit walk off home run to beat the Texas Rangers. This was the first rookie pinch hit walk off in Mariners history. On May 4, 2016, Lee hit two home runs in a 9–8 victory over the Oakland Athletics.

On June 10, 2016, Lee recorded back-to-back home runs off of Derek Holland, totaling 4 RBI to propel the Mariners to a 7–5 victory over the Texas Rangers.

Return to the KBO

Lotte Giants
On January 24, 2017, Lee signed a four-year, $12.9 million contract with the Lotte Giants. The contract was the largest for a free agent in KBO history. Lee's 2017 season was a success, as he hit  with 34 home runs and 111 RBIs. He was instrumental in helping Lotte return to the postseason for the first time in five years.

In 2018, he hit .333 with 37 home runs and 125 RBIs. However, in 2019, Lee failed to reach 20 home runs for the first time in 10 years, and was sent to the second division due to injuries.

Awards and honors
KBO League
2005 KBO All-Star MVP
2008 KBO All-Star MVP
2006 KBO Golden Glove Award (1B)
2007 KBO Golden Glove Award (1B)
2010 KBO MVP (regular season MVP)
2010 KBO Golden Glove Award (3B)
2011 KBO Golden Glove Award (1B)
2017 KBO Golden Glove Award (1B)
2018 KBO Golden Glove Award (DH)

Nippon Professional Baseball
2012 Pacific League Best Nine Award (1B)

Achievements
KBO League
2006 Batting title
2006 Home run title
2006 RBI title
2006 Slugging percentage leader
2006 Triple Crown (BA, HR, RBI title)
2007 Slugging percentage leader
2010 Batting title
2010 Home run title
2010 RBI title
2010 Hits leader
2010 Runs scored leader
2010 Slugging percentage leader
2010 On-base percentage leader
2010 OPS (on-base plus slugging) leader
2010 Triple Crown (BA, HR, RBI title)
2010 Nine consecutive home runs (world record)
2011 Batting title
2011 Hits leader
2011 On-base percentage leader

Nippon Professional Baseball
2012 RBI title

Notable international careers

Filmography

Television shows

See also 
 List of KBO career home run leaders
 List of KBO career RBI leaders

References

External links 

Career statistics and player information from Korea Baseball Organization

Lee Dae-ho at KakaoStory 

1982 births
Asian Games bronze medalists for South Korea
Asian Games gold medalists for South Korea
Asian Games medalists in baseball
Baseball players at the 2006 Asian Games
Baseball players at the 2008 Summer Olympics
Baseball players at the 2010 Asian Games
Fukuoka SoftBank Hawks players
KBO League first basemen
KBO League third basemen
Kyungnam High School alumni
Living people
Lotte Giants players
Major League Baseball first basemen
Major League Baseball players from South Korea
Medalists at the 2006 Asian Games
Medalists at the 2008 Summer Olympics
Medalists at the 2010 Asian Games
Nippon Professional Baseball designated hitters
Nippon Professional Baseball first basemen
Olympic baseball players of South Korea
Olympic gold medalists for South Korea
Olympic medalists in baseball
Orix Buffaloes players
Seattle Mariners players
South Korean expatriate baseball players in Japan
South Korean expatriate baseball players in the United States
Sportspeople from Busan
Tacoma Rainiers players
2009 World Baseball Classic players
2013 World Baseball Classic players
2015 WBSC Premier12 players
2017 World Baseball Classic players
South Korean Buddhists